Luis Leandro Ortiz (born January 27, 1999) is a Dominican professional baseball pitcher for the Pittsburgh Pirates of Major League Baseball (MLB). He made his MLB debut in 2022.

Career
Ortiz was signed by the Pirates out of the Dominican Republic in 2018 for $25,000.

While pitching for the Altoona Curve in 2022, Ortiz threw two immaculate innings in a span of just 25 days, four fewer than the shortest known span between such innings by a Major League pitcher.

Ortiz was promoted to the majors for the first time on September 11, 2022. Pirates general manager Ben Cherington told the press that the club intended to use the remainder of the season to assess the quality of starting pitching in their organization.

See also
 List of Major League Baseball players from the Dominican Republic

References

External links

1999 births
Living people
Altoona Curve players
Bradenton Marauders players
Bristol Pirates players
Dominican Republic expatriate baseball players in the United States
Indianapolis Indians players
Major League Baseball pitchers
Major League Baseball players from the Dominican Republic
Pittsburgh Pirates players
Sportspeople from San Pedro de Macorís
2023 World Baseball Classic players